Alan Webb (born January 13, 1983, in Ann Arbor, Michigan) is an American former track and field athlete and former triathlete. He holds the American national record in the mile, with a time of 3 minutes 46.91 seconds. Webb represented the United States at the 2004 Summer Olympics in the men's 1500-meters race. He competed professionally for Nike until the end of 2013. He retired after the 2014 Millrose Games. He currently serves as head coach for the Ave Maria University cross country, swimming, and track and field teams.

Running career

High school
Webb attended South Lakes High School in Reston, Virginia. In 1999, he broke Jim Ryun's national sophomore mile record of 4:07.8 by running 4:06.94, while beating Nathan Conley (second place) by 1 minute. During the fall season of his senior year, Webb placed second at the 2000 Foot Locker Cross Country Championships behind Dathan Ritzenhein. At the New Balance Games in January 2001, Webb's mile time of 3:59.86 at New York City’s Armory made him the first American high schooler ever to run a sub-four minute mile indoors. Webb's time broke the previous American indoor high school record of Thom Hunt — a 4:02.7 — as well as Hunt's indoor HS AR in the 1500 m (3:46.6) as Webb came through the 1500 mark in 3:43.27. Webb's record was surpassed fifteen years later by Andrew Hunter from Loudoun Valley High School in Virginia with a time of 3:58.25 set on the same track. Four months later, at the age of 18 years, 4 months, and 14 days, on May 27, 2001 at the Prefontaine Classic, Webb ran a mile in 3:53.43 to shatter Ryun's 36-year-old national high school record of 3:55.3, which placed him first on the list of high school students who have run a four minute mile. En route Webb passed the 1500 mark in 3:38.26 to take down Ryun's 37-year-old high school AR of 3:39.0 set in 1964. He followed up his run at Prefontaine by winning the Virginia State High School 800 m title in 1:47.74 to become the fourth-fastest high schooler ever at that distance.    He was Track and Field News "High School Athlete of the Year" in 2001.

Collegiate
Following his high school achievements, Webb went on to run both cross country and track for the University of Michigan. During the fall cross country season, he won several meets including the Wolverine Interregional and the Big Ten Championships (both 8 kilometer races) in times of 25:12 and 23:19.9, respectively. After claiming runner-up at the NCAA Great Lakes Regional to Boaz Cheboiywo, he finished in eleventh place at the NCAA Championships with a time of 29:38 for the 10 kilometer race to earn All-American honors. After redshirting the indoor track season, he won the Big Ten championship in the 1500 m run during the outdoor season, clocking a time of 3:49.27 to win the title. Webb competed in this race at the NCAA Outdoor Track and Field Championships a few weeks later, finishing in fourth place with a time of 3:43.23. Shortly after the completion of the outdoor season, Webb decided to leave the university to turn professional and return to his high school coach and mentor Scott Raczko. He continued his collegiate education at George Mason University.

Post-collegiate/professional

Since turning professional in 2002, Webb has competed for Nike. In 2004 he became an Olympian by winning the 1500 m in the U.S. Olympic Trials. He was later eliminated in the first round of Olympic competition in Athens. In 2005, he won another national title at 1500 m, and made it to the Finals of the World Championships in Helsinki in that event. He also set personal records at every distance from the 1500 to the 5000 m, setting the American record at 2 miles along the way.

In 2007, Webb once again won the national championship in the 1500 m run, surging past Bernard Lagat in the final 50 meters for the title. He then finished 8th in the final of the 1500 m at the World Championships in Osaka, Japan. On July 6, 2007 Webb won the IAAF Golden League meet 1500 m race in Paris in a lifetime best of 3:30.54, third fastest on the American list. On July 21, 2007, at a meet in Brasschaat, Belgium, Webb broke the American record in the mile. His time of 3:46.91 bested the 25-year-old record of 3:47.69 run by Steve Scott. He ended the year with a victory in the New York Fifth Avenue Mile.

On July 6, 2008, Webb failed to qualify for the Beijing Olympics in the 1500 m after finishing 5th in the US Olympic Trials in Eugene, Oregon with a time of 3:41.62.

After many disappointing results since breaking the American mile record, Webb decided in August 2009 to move to Portland, Oregon, to train with coach Alberto Salazar.  At the time, Salazar already coached Kara Goucher, Galen Rupp, Amy Yoder Begley, and Dathan Ritzenhein, and Webb was his first 1500 m runner. In March 2011, Webb decided to leave Salazar on amicable terms.

In 2010, he underwent surgery for an Achilles tendon injury and returned at the Fifth Avenue Mile in September, finishing in fourth behind defending champion Andrew Baddeley.

After his split with coach Alberto Salazar, Webb decided to be coached closer to home under the University of Virginia's Jason Vigilante.

Webb returned to Portland to join Jerry Schumacher’s group and was focused on 5000 m & 10,000 m, and eventually the marathon.

Webb announced his retirement from track running following the 2014 Millrose Games Wannamaker Mile on February 15, 2014.

Coach
In 2013, Webb began as a volunteer assistant coach at Portland State University for cross country. In July 2019, Webb became an assistant  cross country coach and distance coach at the University of Arkansas at Little Rock., he finished off coaching at Catholic High School in the fall of 2021 for cross country along side Coach Jennifer Found.

Personal
Alan Webb married Julia Rudd in October 2010, who also enjoys running and is an assistant coach for a high school cross country team. A convert to Catholicism and LIFE Runners member, Alan and Julia have three daughters, Joanie, Paula and Gabriella (Gabby).

Select races by event

800 m

1500 m

Mile

3000 m

2 Mile

5000 m

10000 m

Cross Country

Personal records

Outdoors

Indoors

Cross country

See also
 Middle distance track event
 Nike, Inc.

References

Further reading

External links
 Alan Webb at USA Track & Field
 
 
 
 
 
 Video of Alan Webb's American Record for the mile

1983 births
Living people
American Roman Catholics
American male middle-distance runners
American male long-distance runners
Athletes (track and field) at the 2004 Summer Olympics
Converts to Roman Catholicism
Michigan Wolverines men's track and field athletes
Olympic track and field athletes of the United States
People from Reston, Virginia
Sportspeople from Fairfax County, Virginia
Track and field athletes from Virginia